This is a list of presidents of Austria since the establishment of that office in 1919.

List of officeholders (1920–present)

Presidents of Austria during the Interwar period

Austria was part of Nazi Germany from 12 March 1938 to 13 April 1945.

Presidents of Austria after the end of World War II

† denotes people who died in office.

Timeline

See also
 History of Austria
 Politics of Austria
 Rulers of Austria
 President of Austria
 Chancellor of Austria
 List of chancellors of Austria

Notes

External links
 Official Website of the Austrian President
 Austria: Heads of State: 1918–1938 and 1938–2017

 
Austria
Presidents